Plumpton Place is a Grade II* listed Elizabethan manor house in Plumpton, East Sussex, England.

Description
Plumpton Place looks onto the nearby north-facing escarpment of the South Downs, with Plumpton College (formerly Plumpton Agricultural College) and the 11th-century church of St Michael's and All Angels immediately adjacent to the west and Plumpton village some 500m to the east. There is an entrance formed of two cottages designed by Sir Edwin Lutyens, with a Palladian porch and this leads to his modern bridge over the moat. 

It was built in 1568 on the site of an earlier house which was mentioned in the Domesday Book. The North and South parts of the house date from the 1400s, some of which incorporates local flint. 

Various building materials have been used in the construction of the house. It is believed that the north wing is the earliest, as there is a date-stone of 1568 with the initials I.M. The west wing seems to date from a later period, circa 1600. Over a hundred years later there was a period of rebuilding in brick and some additions by Lutyens. There are lakeside gardens by Edwin Lutyens and Gertrude Jekyll, within large grounds, that include both woodland and pasture.

Past owners
Plumpton Place was formerly the home of George Miles Watson, 2nd Baron Manton (1899–1968), who maintained a race-horse stud there.

In 1927, it was purchased by Edward Hudson, the founder of Country Life magazine. Hudson initiated a major restoration of the property, which had gone into a state of disrepair, by hiring Lutyens to revamp the main house and mill house, and Jekyll to oversee the 60 acres of land and lakes.

In 1969, a doctor bought the property after the previous owner – a woman with a distaste for longhaired rock stars – refused to sell it to George Harrison of the Beatles and his wife Pattie Boyd. Three years later, however, the same doctor sold it to Led Zeppelin guitarist Jimmy Page. The latter owned the property from 1972 to 1985. The American financier Thomas Perkins owned Plumpton Place for many years.

Plumpton Place was used as the main location for the 2019 film adaptation of Carmilla by Sheridan Le Fanu.

References

Country houses in East Sussex
Grade II* listed buildings in East Sussex
Works of Edwin Lutyens in England
Place